Walt Dickerson Plays Unity is an album led by vibraphonist and composer Walt Dickerson recorded in 1964 and released on the Audio Fidelity label.

Reception

The Allmusic site awarded the album 4½ stars. The DownBeat reviewer stated: "Unity is a brooding, darkly moody excursion into tonal and rhythmic (both drummers play simultaneously) impressionism. The trouble is that it never gets beyond the immediate impressionistic moment into a larger design above and beyond the performances".

Track listing 
All compositions by Walt Dickerson and Sidney Frey.
 "Unity" - 16:23
 "High Moon" - 17:40

Personnel 
Walt Dickerson - vibraphone
Walter Davis, Jr. – piano  
George Tucker – bass
Edgar Bateman, Andrew Cyrille – drums

References 

1964 albums
Walt Dickerson albums
Audio Fidelity Records albums